Mob Trial 3, also called Mob Trial 3: The Verdict, is a collaboration album between American rappers and Mob Figaz members The Jacka, Fed-X & AP.9, released on May 20, 2008. It peaked at #91 on the R&B/Hip-Hop Albums chart, making it The Jacka's first charting album, and Fed-X and AP.9's only charting album to date. The album is the third, and most successful, album of the Mob Trial trilogy.

Track listing

References

2008 albums
Collaborative albums
The Jacka albums
Sequel albums